Adi Keyh Subregion is a subregion in the Debub (Southern) region (Zoba Debub) of Eritrea. Its capital lies at Adi Keyh.

References

Subregions of Eritrea

Southern Region (Eritrea)
Subregions of Eritrea